Igor Zeiger , (born 1977) is an Uzbekistan-born Israeli artist and curator.

Biography
Igor Zeiger was born in 1977 in Tashkent, Uzbekistan to Mark Zeiger, an engineer and Larisa Yavetz, schoolteacher. He graduated from Tashkent University of Information Technologies with master's degree in communications. Zeiger immigrated to Israel in 2000, living first in kibbutz Ramat Hashofet, then Rehovot and moving to Tel Aviv in 2011. Igor Zeiger lives and works in Jaffa.

Career 
Zeiger started with documentary photography as an autodidact. He studied in Studio Gavra School of Photography in class of Sagit Zluf Namir, graduating in 2012. His mentors included David Adika, Gaston Zvi Ickowicz and Nissan N. Perez. In April 2015, Zeiger's photograph was published on the cover of "Israeli Lens" magazine, predecessor of international "Lens Magazine". In 2016, Igor's photograph was chosen as a poster photo for Paco Anselmi documentary film "Karam: A Matter Of Karma", screened at TLVFest.  Zeiger lives and works in Jaffa. Zeiger is Fellow of the Royal Society of Arts. He is also a member of Israeli Association of Visual Artists and Royal Photographic Society. Zeiger founded artistic cooperative Beam Collective together with two fellow artists Maria Rosenblatt and Erica Tal-Shir in 2018.

Zeiger works have been published in the several magazines and newspapers around the world, including Haaretz, Calcalist,  Sky Arte Italia, Devour Madrid, Israeli Lens, Lens Magazine, Noviny Kraje and The North American Post, Lidové noviny, Queer.de.

Exhibitions

Solo 
 2015 "Same as You". "Mazeh 9" Municipal Gallery. Tel Aviv.
 2017 "Photography clarifies a place". Curated by David Adika and Gaston Zvi Ickowicz. Photo:Israel 2017, Tel Aviv.
 2021 “Month of Photography Denver”, Biennale. Colorado Photographic Arts Center, Denver, Colorado, USA
 2021 "Modern Renaissance". Photo:Israel 2021. Curated by Ivar van Emden. Tel Aviv.

Group 
 2014 “Picture Peace”. Circle 1 Gallery. Berlin. Germany.
 2014 “Picture Peace”. Beit-HaGefen Arab Jewish Culture Center. Haifa, Israel.
 2015 "Another". Curated by Shenhav Levi. Gan Meir Gallery. Tel Aviv Municipal LGBT Community Center. Tel Aviv.
 2015 "Beauty Where You Find It". Curated by Connie and Jerry Rosenthal. "LightBox" Gallery. Astoria, Oregon. USA.
 2016 "Postage Required". Vermont Center for Photography. Brattleboro. VT. USA
 2016 "Secret Art". "Meni House" - Bank Leumi Museum. Tel Aviv.
 2016 "Books, gentlemen...books". Curated by Hanita Elizur. "Green House" Gallery, Tel Aviv University, Tel Aviv. 
 2016 "Intervals". Minshar Art Gallery. Tel Aviv 
 2016 "Foodprocessor - food as a tool of sending a message". Curated by Dalit Merhav, "Sarona Art" Gallery. Tel Aviv.
 2016 "Shades of gray:  perspective of an old age". Curated by Hanita Elizur. The New Gallery. Bat Yam Art Institute. Bat Yam. Israel
 2016 “Imagination 2016”. Contemporary Israeli Art Exhibition, Bank Hapoalim Art Center, Tel Aviv.
 2016 "Traces of real". Curated by Doron Furman. "Central" Gallery. Tel Aviv
 2017 "Abject Art". Curated by Doron Furman. Central Gallery. Tel Aviv
 2017 "Secret Postcard" Project. Fresh Paint 7 Art Fair. Tel Aviv 
 2017 "Books, gentlemen...books". Curated by Hanita Elizur. Social Sciences Faculty Library & Gallery, Tel Aviv University, Tel Aviv.
 2018 "Queer Performance: From Gilbert & George to the Present Day". As part "Dangerous Art" exhibitions cluster curated by Svetlana Reingold. Haifa Museum of Art
 2018 "World Fair", Canton Museum of Art, Canton, Ohio, USA
 2018 "Secret Postcard" Project. Fresh Paint 8 Art Fair. Tel Aviv 
 2018 "From nine to five". Curated by Hanita Elizur. Artist House Gallery. Rishon LeZion, Israel
 2018 "Nope, still can't see any difference". Curated by Olga Yerushalmy-Sorokin. Abrahams Gallery. Tel Aviv.
 2019 "Barbarians: a censorship archive". Mamuta Art Research Center at Hansen House. Jerusalem
 2019 "From nine to five". Curated by Hanita Elizur. Social Sciences Faculty Library & Gallery, Tel Aviv University, Tel Aviv.
 2019 "Facade". Curated by Doron Furman. Central Gallery. Tel Aviv
 2019 "Impersonation". Curated by Doron Furman. Central Gallery. Tel Aviv
 2019 "Sexy Summer in Little Tel Aviv". Curated by Yohanan Cherson. Ben Ami Gallery. Tel Aviv
 2019 "Between Eros and Nudity". Curated by Olga Yerushalmy-Sorokin and Ksenia Nazarov. Abrahams Gallery. Tel Aviv.
 2019 "Standart Deviation". Curated by Sagit Zluf Namir. Photo:Israel 2019, Tel Aviv.
 2020 “Art in Quarantine“. Curated by Diogo Marques. “Wr3ad1ng d1g1t5” Project. Lisbon. Portugal
 2020 “Art in Isolation“. North Dakota Museum of Art. Grand Forks, North Dakota. USA
 2020 "Re-volver". Curated by Luíza Marcolino. Fine Art Gallery. Federal University of Minas Gerais. Belo Horizonte. Brazil
 2020 "PO-MO II". Curated by Hikmet Şahin. Art Gallery. Faculty of Fine Arts. Selçuk University. Konya. Turkey.
 2020 "Reconstruct". Curated by Lars Deike and Richard Schemmerer. "Pride Art Atelier" gallery. Berlin. Germany.
 2020 "Art Thru The Lens". Yeiser Art Center. Paducah, Kentucky, United States
 2020 eSSeRCi SeNZa eSSeRCi 2020 (XIII edizione). “Dada Boom” Center of Contemporary Art and Photography. Viareggio, Lucca, Italy
 2021 “Twenty of Pandemics and other demons“, Aguadilla y del Caribe Museum of Art, Puerto Rico
 2021 "Either Way", Curated by Olga Yerushalmi and Ksenia Nazarov. Central Gallery for Contemporary Art. Tel Aviv, Israel
 2021 "The Haifa Way: 70th Anniversary of Haifa Museum of Art". Haifa Museum of Art, Israel.
 2021 "Stone, paper, scissors and other non-childish games". Curated by Olga Yerushalmy-Sorokin and Ksenia Nazarov. Abrahams Gallery. Tel Aviv
 2021 "Reference". La Culture Initiative. Amiad Center. Jaffa. Curated by Itay Blaish.
 2021 "Nature: Morte?". Beam Collective Gallery. Jaffa. Curated by Erika Tal-Shir.
 2022 “Cloister”, Curated by Dr. Christian Seipel, Klostergalerie Museum, Zehdenick, Germany
 2022 “Through My Eyes“, Curated by Yana Gorelik. Abrahams Gallery. Tel Aviv
 2022 “Anything goes…“, “Flood Gallery“, Black Mountain, North Carolina, USA.
 2022 "Nudus", The Gallerium, Toronto, Canada.
 2022 "Self Portrait", Uppsala Konstnärsklubb, Uppsala, Sweden.
 2022 "Two Truths and One Lie", Curated by Ksenia Nazarov and Olga Yerushalmy. Abrahams Gallery. Tel Aviv
 2022 "Body Pride", Curated by Erez Bialer. Pan Art Gallery.
 2022 "Call for Action", Curated by Eyal Landesman and Ya’ara Raz Haklai. Photo:Israel 2022, Tel Aviv.
 2022 “Imagination 2022”. Contemporary Israeli Art Exhibition, Bank Hapoalim Art Center, Tel Aviv.
 2023 "Call for Action", Curated by Eyal Landesman and Ya’ara Raz Haklai. Photo:Israel 2022, Eilat, Israel.

Curatorship 
 2015. "Same as You". "Mazeh 9" Municipal  Gallery. Tel Aviv.
 2016. "Faces. Israeli Portrait in classical and modern view". Mansion House Gallery, Tel Aviv. 
 2017. "Nonplace: dance and movement". Central Gallery for Contemporary Art, Tel Aviv  
 2020. "Eros and Thanatos". "Beam Collective" gallery. Jaffa.
 2020. "Curated by Social Networks". "Beam Collective" gallery. Jaffa.
 2021. "Same as You. Take Two". "Beam Collective" gallery. Jaffa.
 2022. "Ansel Adams, Photographs of Japanese-American Internment at Manzanar". "Irrational Light" Gallery

Collections 
Igor Zeiger works are in permanent collections of Haifa Museum of Art, Jerusalem Municipal Library, Yeiser Art Center, Klostergalerie Museum, Zehdenick; Caribbean Art Museum, Puerto Rico and United Kingdom Government Art Collection

Bibliography 
 
 "UN//TITLED", An Anthology of Queer Contemporary Art (2016-2020). Published by "Balaclava.q"

References

External links

Igor Zeiger
Igor Zeiger on America-Israel Cultural Foundation

Israeli photographers
Israeli LGBT photographers
1977 births
Living people
Israeli art curators
Artists from Tashkent
People from Jaffa
Royal Photographic Society members